Yakhroma is a town in Dmitrovsky District of Moscow Oblast, Russia, located on the Yakhroma River,  north of Moscow. Population:

History
It was founded in 1841 as a settlement servicing a local textile factory on the Yakroma River. In 1901, a railway station, which later adopted the same name, was built near the settlement on the Moscow (Savyolovsky)–Kimry (Savyolovo) line. The settlement was granted town status in 1940.

Administrative and municipal status
Within the framework of administrative divisions, it is, together with thirty-seven rural localities, incorporated within Dmitrovsky District as the Town of Yakhroma. As a municipal division, the Town of Yakhroma is incorporated within Dmitrovsky Municipal District as Yakhroma Urban Settlement.

References

Notes

Sources

Cities and towns in Moscow Oblast
Populated places in Dmitrovsky District, Moscow Oblast